A brain is a biological organ.

Brain(s) or The Brain may also refer to:

Arts and entertainment

Films 
 The Brain (1962 film), directed by Freddie Francis
 The Brain (1969 film), a French comedy film directed by Gérard Oury
 The Brain (1988 film), a Canadian science fiction horror film

Music
 Brain Records, a German record label prominent in the 1970s
 The Brains, an Atlanta band who did the original version of the song "Money Changes Everything"
 Brain (EP), a 1993 split EP with the bands Klinik and Paracont
 "BRAINS!", a 2002 song by the musician Voltaire, from the television show The Grim Adventures of Billy and Mandy
 Brain (album), a 2004 album from Hiromi Uehara
 "Brain", a song on the 2006 album The Zico Chain by Zico Chain
 "Brain", a song on the 2001 album In Search of... by N.E.R.D.
 "Brains", song by the band Lower Dens from their album Nootropics
 "Brains", song by the band The Presets from their album Hi Viz

Television
The Brain with David Eagleman, a 2015 American television series
Brain (TV series), a 2011 South Korean KBS medical drama series
The Brain (game show), a 2014 Chinese series
"Brains", a 2011 Voltron Force episode

Fictional characters
 The Brain (Bell comics), created by Leo Bachle for Bell Features
 Brains (Thunderbirds), in the 1960s British series
 Brain (comics), a DC Comics villain
 Brain, a mouse in the cartoon series Pinky and the Brain and Animaniacs
 Brain (Top Cat), a cat in the Top Cat animated series and movie
 Brain (Inspector Gadget), a dog in the cartoon series
 The Brain (Arthur), an anthropomorphic bear in the television series
 "Brain", a character in the film Igor
 The B.R.A.I.N. machine, from the film 9
 Dr. Brain, in the 1990s Dr. Brain series of educational games
 Brain, a character played by American rapper Lil Dicky on his EP I'm Brain

Novels 
 Brain (novel), by Robin Cook

People
 Brain (surname)
 "The Brain", nickname of Bobby Heenan (1944-2017), wrestler and manager
 "The Brain", nickname of Arnold Rothstein (1882-1928), gangster and gambler
 Bryan Mantia (born 1963), American rock drummer nicknamed "Brain"
 Zelda the Brain, a female professional wrestler from the Gorgeous Ladies of Wrestling
 M.C. Brains (born 1974), American rapper

Places 
 Brain, Côte-d'Or, France, a commune
 Brains, Loire-Atlantique, France, a commune
 River Brain, Essex, England

Science and technology 
 Brain (journal), a peer-reviewed scientific journal of neurology founded in 1878
 Brain (computer virus), first released in 1986, considered to be the first computer virus for MS-DOS
 TheBrain, mind mapping and personal knowledge base software from TheBrain Technologies

Other uses 
 Baron Brain, a noble title
 The Brain (club), in London
 Brains Brewery, a regional brewery in Wales
 The Brain Prize, an international research award

See also 
 BRAIN Initiative, a 2013 American initiative to map the human brain
 various Irish kings:
 Cellach mac Brain (died 834), King of Leinster
 Cennselach mac Brain (died 770), a king of the Uí Cheinnselaig of South Leinster
 Máel Muad mac Brain (died 978), King of Munster
 Muiredach mac Brain (died 885), King of Leinster
 Muiredach mac Brain (died 818), King of Leinster
 Ruarc mac Brain (died 862), King of Leinster
 Brane (disambiguation)
 Brayne, a list of people with the surname

Lists of people by nickname
ru:Мозг (значения)